Aimirgin Glúngel tuir tend, Middle Irish poem by Gilla in Chomded húa Cormaic.

Overview

Aimirgin Glúngel tuir tend ("Aimirgin bright-knee the strong hero") is a Middle Irish poem on the authors and laws of Ireland, by Gilla in Chomded húa Cormaic (fl. 1150-c.1170), who was a poet and monastic scholar of Tulach Léis. The date range of the work is c. 1100–1160.

See also

 Early Irish law

External links
 http://www.ucc.ie/celt/published/G100033/index.html

References

Manuscript sources

 Royal Irish Academy, MS 1225, folios 142r–v (alias D ii 1, alias Book of Uí Maine, late 14th to early 15th century. Adam Cuisin copied this poem sometime between 1392 and 1407. R. A. S. Macalister (ed), The Book of Uí Maine, Facsimiles in Collotype of Irish Manuscripts IV (Dublin: Irish Manuscripts Commission 1942); Catalogue of Irish Manuscripts in the Royal Irish Academy, pp 3314–56).
 National Library of Ireland, MS G 488, pages 21–28 (18th to 19th century. Scribe unknown. Nessa Ní Shéaghdha, Catalogue of Irish Manuscripts in the National Library of Ireland, fasc. 10 (Dublin: Institute for Advanced Studies 1987) 99–101).
 Dublin, King's Inns, MS 20, pages 187–91 (c. 1720. Scribe: Tadhg Ó Neachtain. Pádraig de Brún, Catalogue of Irish manuscripts in King's Inns library, Dublin (Dublin: Institute for Advanced Studies 1972).)
 Royal Irish Academy, MS 775, page 57 (alias F v 4. Fragmentary: first two quatrains only).
 Trinity College Dublin Library, 1318, columns 341–42, lower margin (alias H 2. 16 alias Yellow Book of Lecan. A copy of quatrain 25 only).

Editions
 Liam Breatnach, Canon law and secular law in early Ireland: the significance of Bretha Nemed, Peritia 3 (1984) 439–59: 440–41 (edition of 6 quatrains of the poem).
 Peter Smith, Aimirgin Glúngel tuir tend: a Middle-Irish poem on the authors and laws of Ireland, Peritia 8 (1994) 120–50.

Translation
 Liam Breatnach, Canon law and secular law in early Ireland: the significance of Bretha Nemed, Peritia 3 (1984) 439–59: 440–41 (translation of 6 quatrains of the poem).
 Peter Smith, Aimirgin Glúngel tuir tend: a Middle-Irish poem on the authors and laws of Ireland, Peritia 8 (1994) 120–50.

Secondary literature
 Liam Breatnach, Canon law and secular law in early Ireland: the significance of Bretha Nemed, Peritia 3 (1984) 439–59: 440–41.
 Peter Smith, Aimirgin Glúngel tuir tend: a Middle-Irish poem on the authors and laws of Ireland, Peritia 8 (1994) 120–50.

Irish literature
Irish poems
Irish texts
Early Irish literature
Irish-language literature
Medieval poetry
12th-century poems